Camas Prairie Centennial Marsh Wildlife Management Area at  is an Idaho wildlife management area in Camas County south of the community of Hill City. The WMA is at the base of the Bennett Hills on the Camas Prairie south of the Soldier Mountains and Sawtooth National Forest. The Idaho Department of Fish and Game acquired the land in 1987 with the help of Ducks Unlimited and The Nature Conservancy to provide quality wetland and upland habitat for migratory and resident wildlife.

The flat tableland on the prairie creates a large floodplain for Camas Creek, flooding the Camas Prairie to a depth of less than  during spring runoff, but it is often dry by mid-July. The shallow water provides habitat for emergent vegetation predominantly Carex and Juncus species.

Camas lilies bloom beginning in late May, and the area attracts many birds, including Canada geese, mallards, gadwalls, American wigeons, northern pintails, northern shovelers, lesser scaup, canvasbacks, redheads, ruddy ducks, and blue-winged, green-winged, and cinnamon teals. Gray partridge and sage grouse are found in upland areas, and there are a variety of other birds species found at the WMA.

References

Protected areas established in 1987
Protected areas of Camas County, Idaho
Wildlife management areas of Idaho
1987 establishments in Idaho